Bossa Nova is an album of Bossa nova compositions by Ramsey Lewis' Trio featuring tracks recorded in 1962 and released on the Argo label.

Reception

Allmusic awarded the album 4 stars stating "the Ramsey Lewis Trio embraced the sunkissed Rio groove to create one of its most unusual and engaging LPs".

Track listing
 "Samba de Orpheus" (Antônio Carlos Jobim, Luiz Bonfá) - 3:35   
 "Maha de Carnaval (The Morning of the Carnaval)" (Jobim, Bonfá) - 4:41   
 "A Criancinhas (The Children)" (El Dee Young) - 2:37   
 "A Noite Do Meu Bem (The Night of My Love)" (Dolores Duran) - 4:17   
 "O Pato (The Duck)"  (Jayme Silva, Neuza Teixeira) - 2:37   
 "Generique (Happiness)" (Traditional) - 5:00   
 "Roda Moinho (Whirlpool)" (Vince Guaraldi) - 3:19   
 "Cara de Palhaco (The Face of the Clown)" (Traditional) - 2:22   
 "Canacao para Geralda (A Song for Geraldine)" (Ramsey Lewis) - 6:17

Personnel 
Ramsey Lewis - piano
El Dee Young - bass
Issac "Red" Holt - drums
Josef Paulo - guitar, pandeiro, vocals
Carmen Costa - cabaça, vocals

References 

1962 albums
Ramsey Lewis albums
Argo Records albums
Albums produced by Ralph Bass